The Frankish tower of Lilaia is a late medieval tower near Lilaia, in Phocis, central Greece.

Lilaia lies on the northern slopes of Mount Parnassus and close to the springs of the Boeotic Cephissus. The tower is built on top of the well-preserved Classical-era city wall, and its lower part is built entirely of reused spolia, whereas the upper parts are built with quarried stone and brick.

Its entrance was above-ground at the level of the first floor, on the western wall. Its exception size makes it very likely that it was the centre of an estate or fief.

References

Sources
 
 

Lilaia
Duchy of Athens
Lilaia
Buildings and structures in Phocis